Blackguards 2 is a tactical role-playing game developed and published by Daedalic Entertainment for Microsoft Windows and OS X in January 2015. It was ported to PlayStation 4 and Xbox One in September 2017 and Nintendo Switch in June 2022. It is a sequel to 2014's The Dark Eye: Blackguards.

Gameplay
Battles are turn-based and take place on a hexagonally gridded playing field. Units can topple stacked boxes, activate traps, cast spells, and drop chandeliers on enemies to attack them. The player comes across allies as they progress through the story, which each have skill trees and can be equipped with weapons or gear.

Plot
Three years have passed since Count Uria's plots. The Vanquishers of the Nine Hordes long parted ways but life in Aventuria went on. Cassia, a young woman of noble descent, has only one goal: She wants to claim the Shark Throne, no matter the price; and be it only for one day. Unfortunately, there are two problems that potentially foil her plans. First of all, she spends her days incarcerated in a dungeon and secondly, there is already a man on her throne: Marwan. She is neither fond nor proficient in matters of diplomacy or politics, so she chooses a more... practical approach. She intends to break out of prison and overthrow Marwan to claim the throne herself. For this, she needs strong allies. She needs to recruit an army of Sellswords and rally the Vanquishers of the Nine Hordes around her. Sounds like a solid plan, doesn't it? But then again, how cunning must one be to escape the dungeon's walls; and how reckless must one be to gather and command the worst scum of the realms?

Development and release

Blackguard 2 was released for Microsoft Windows and OS X on January 20, 2015. It was ported to PlayStation 4 and Xbox One on September 12, 2017, and for Nintendo Switch on June 15, 2022.

Reception

Blackguards 2 received average reviews from professional critics upon release. Aggregate review website Metacritic assigned the PC version a score of 74/100 based on 48 reviews.
IGN rates it 7.8 out of 10, commenting that it improved on its predecessor: "you can spend less time confused about the details, and more time fighting."

References

External links
 

2015 video games
Daedalic Entertainment games
Dark fantasy video games
MacOS games
Single-player video games
Tactical role-playing video games
Turn-based tactics video games
Video game sequels
Video games based on tabletop role-playing games
Video games developed in Germany
Video games featuring female protagonists
Windows games